Colour of the Trap is the debut solo album by English musician Miles Kane, released on 6 May 2011 by Columbia Records. It was mainly written by Kane and frequent collaborator Alex Turner alongside Gruff Rhys and Sean Bonniwell. It was produced in London by Rhys, Dan Carey, Dan the Automator and Craig Silvey. The record features guest musicians Clémence Poésy on the track "Happenstance" and Noel Gallagher on "My Fantasy". The album peaked to number 11 on the UK Albums Chart.

The cover features a black and white picture of Kane, taken by Laurence Ellis, with his name superimposed in light purple.

Critical reception

The album received generally positive reviews. At Metacritic, which assigns a normalised rating out of 100 to reviews from mainstream critics, the album received an average score of 73, based on 15 reviews. All-noise said "Colour of the Trap is a promising and entertaining first solo effort, if he can get the mix of attention-grabbing chart fodder and deeper, engaging album tracks right then you get the feeling Miles Kane might just become unstoppable", while Scotsman.com said "He has the tunes, but occasionally sounds strained with the effort of being hip and popular. The retro hang-ups get in the way of something undeniably modern. Colour of the Trap is one of the few to escape that syndrome." Jamie Crossman from NME said "‘Colour of the Trap’ isn’t quite a perfect debut, but by stepping out from the shadows, Miles Kane has come away smelling of roses."

Singles 
Three singles were released from the album. "Inhaler" was the first singled to be released, peaking at number 171 on the UK Singles Chart. "Come Closer" was the second single to be released from the album, reaching 85 on the UK Singles Chart. "Rearrange", the album's third and as yet final single, peaked to number 149 on the UK Singles Chart.

Track listing

Charts

Certifications

Release history

Personnel
Credits adapted from Colour of the Trap liner notes.
 Miles Kane – vocals, guitar
 Dan Carey – bass, keyboards
 Leo Taylor – drums 
 Gruff Rhys – backing vocals (1, 2, 4, 8), bass (8)
 Lianne Barnes – backing vocals (1, 2, 11, 12)
 Chris Walmsley – drums (3, 8, 9)
 Ben Parsons – keyboards (8)
 Eugene McGuinness – backing vocals, guitar (6)
 Noel Gallagher – backing vocals (3)
 Clémence Poésy – vocals (4)
 Antonia Pagulatos – violin (3, 12)
 Oli Langford – violin (3, 12)
 Mike Pagulatos – viola (3, 12)
 Isabelle Dunn – cello (3, 12)
 Phillip Anderson – bass (6)
 Andrew Waterworth – double bass (9)
 Osian Gwynedd – piano (9)

Production
 Dan Carey – production (1-5, 7, 10-12)
 Gruff Rhys – production (8, 9)
 Craig Sylvey – production (6, 8, 9), backing vocal recording (6)

References

2011 debut albums
Miles Kane albums
Albums produced by Dan Carey (record producer)
Albums produced by Dan the Automator
Columbia Records albums